Zoarcoidei is a suborder of marine ray-finned fishes belonging to the order Scorpaeniformes. The suborder includes the wolffishes, gunnels and eelpouts. The suborder includes about 400 species. These fishes predominantly found in the boreal seas of the northern hemisphere but they have colonised the southern hemisphere.

Taxonomy
Zoarcoidei was first proposed as a taxonomic grouping by the American zoologist Theodore Gill in 1893 as the superfamily Zoarceoidea. The 5th edition of Fishes of the World classifies the Zoarcoidei as a suborder within the order Scorpaeniformes. Other authorities classify this taxon as the infraorder Zoarcales wihin the suborder Cottoidei of the Perciformes because removing the Scorpaeniformes from the Perciformes renders that taxon non monophyletic. The monophyly of this grouping has still not been fully ascertained but it is generally accepted that the most basal family is Bathymasteridae.

Timeline

Families
Zoarcoidei has the following families classified under it:
 Anarhichadidae Bonaparte, 1835 (wolffishes)
 Bathymasteridae Jordan & Gilbert, 1883 (ronquils)
 Cryptacanthodidae Gill, 1861
 Pholidae Gill, 1893 (gunnels)
 Ptilichthyidae Jordan & Gilbert, 1883 (Quillfish)
 Scytalinidae Jordan & Starks, 1895
 Stichaeidae Gill, 1864 (pricklebacks)
 Eulophiidae H. M. Smith, 1902 (Spinous eelpouts)
 Zaproridae Jordan, 1896 (prowfish)
 Zoarcidae Swainson, 1839 (eelpouts)

Etymology
Zoarcoidei is based on the genus name Zoarces which was coined by Georges Cuvier in 1829 and which means "live bearing", as in the type species Zoarces viviparus, the viviparous blenny.

Characteristics
The Zoarcoidei families all share a single feature, the possession of a single nostril, and there is no other features or group of features which mark out the Zoarcoids as a taxonomic grouping.

Distribution
The Zoarcoidei is thought to have originated in the northern hemisphere, particularly the northwestern Pacific Ocean and one of the families, the Zoarcidae, has colonised the southern hemisphere on a number of occasions.

References

 

 
Scorpaeniformes
Ray-finned fish suborders
Taxa named by Theodore Gill